FC Khikhani Khulo (Georgian: საფეხბურთო კლუბი ხიხანი) is a defunct Georgian association football club from the town of Khulo.

The team took part in Meore Liga and Regionuli Liga for six seasons combined. In 2021, they withdrew from the league.

History
Khikhani was founded in 2015 with financial support from the Acharistskali Georgia power company, engaged in HEP construction nearby. The team made a debut in Meore Liga in the same year and finished in the 4th place.
 
Due to reorganization of the Georgian league structure, the next season 56 clubs out of 64 were relegated from the league. Among them was Khikhani, despite coming 3rd in their group.

The club became a member of Regionuli Liga, where they spent next four seasons. Following the first year, when Khikhani achieved their main goal, in 2018 the team faced worsening financial problems.  

In March 2021, Khikhani played their last matches both in the Cup and league tournaments and suspended their activities.

Seasons

Name
The club was named after the medieval Khikhani (Khirkhati) castle, located in 45 km from municipal centre Khulo.

References

External Links

Profile on Soccerway

Football clubs in Georgia (country)
Defunct football clubs in Georgia (country)